Balbala is a mountain of the Garhwal Himalaya in Uttarakhand India. It is situated in the Zanskar Range on the border between India and China. It is 100th highest located entirely within the Uttarakhand. Nanda Devi, is the highest mountain in this category. It lies 2 km east of Balbala West  . Saraswati Parbat I  lies 6.5 km ENE and it is 9.6 km WNW of Chamrao Parbat I . It lies 6.7 km ESE of Tara Parbat .

Climbing history
It was first climbed in 1947 by the Swiss Expedition of there Garhwal Expedition in which they started from Gangotri range. The team consisted of Mme Lohner, Andre Roch, Alfred Sutter, Alexandre Graven, Rene Dittert and four Sherpas. On 25, August at 10.30 a.m. they reached the summit of Balbala. The summiters are Dittert, Sutter, Ang Norbu, Graven, Tenzing, and Annelies Lohner.

Neighboring and subsidiary peaks
Neighboring or subsidiary peaks of Balbala:
 Kamet:  
 Abi Gamin:  
 Mukut Parbat: 
 Saraswati Parbat I: 
 Balbala west: 
 Chamrao Parbat I: 

A team from the first battalion of the Indo-Tibetan Border Police (ITBP) also successfully climbed the peak. On September 4, 2021, the ITBP Sector Level Mountaineering Expedition (SHQ Dehradun) code name 'Parakram' summited the peak. Team was consisting Six summiteers Assistant Commandant Bhim Singh, Sub Inspector Praveen, Sub Inspector Ashish Ranjan, Sub Inspector Nikhil Gahlot, Constable Sunil Kumar and Constable Pradeep Panwar including guide Raju Martolia. The expedition was launched on 7 August from Joshimath, Uttarakhand.
It was the first summit by any Indian expedition after a Swiss expedition which made it to the top.

Glaciers and rivers
Dakshini Chamrao glacier, Balbala glacier and Paschimi Kamet glacier all the glacier drain their water in the Saraswati River which then joins Alaknanda River at Keshav Prayag near Mana village. Alaknanda River is one of the main tributaries of river Ganga that later joins Bhagirathi River the other main tributaries of river Ganga at Devprayag and became Ganga there after.

See also

 List of Himalayan peaks of Uttarakhand

References

Mountains of Uttarakhand
Six-thousanders of the Himalayas
Geography of Chamoli district